Coney Island or Inishmulclohy, is an island between the Rosses Point and Coolera peninsulas in Sligo Bay, County Sligo, Ireland. It is one of several islands of the same name off the coast of Ireland. It is an island of approximately 400 acres and is named after the vast quantity of rabbits which can be spotted on the island at any time, the Irish for rabbit being  and (coney (historically ) was an English word for a rabbit or rabbit hair, both originally deriving from the Latin cuniculus, meaning "rabbit").

History 
In 1862 the island had a population of 124 people, with 45 children attending the local school. The island now has only one family of permanent inhabitants (traceable back to the 1750s) but has many other temporary residents, especially in the summer months. The island gained electricity in 1999 via an underground cable.

Demographics

Activities

Visitors to Coney Island like to frequent the local pub, spot the faerie ring and Napoleonic star shaped forts, visit Carty’s strand (the secluded beach to the rear of the island) for a swim or walk around the island to spot rabbits or the schoolhouse and other famine structures which remain.

Folklore
There are also stories of faeries, mermaids and spirits on Coney Island, and visitors can try to find the elusive St. Patricks wishing chair, St. Patricks well, the remains of a washed up whale and some fairy forts.

In the late 1700s, the merchant ship Arethusa sailed the route between Sligo and New York City. Regarding the naming of New York's Coney Island: one theory is that the ship's captain named that island after Sligo's Coney Island.

Access
Coney Island is accessible by boat from Rosses Point, or by driving or walking over the causeway, two and a half kilometers across Cummeen Strand, guided by 14 pillars, at low tide. The bollards were constructed in the mid-1800s, lining up with the Black Rock lighthouse, to aid in night time travel across the bay. A spate of drowning tragedies in the 1800s, including that of the then owner of the island, William Dorrin, in 1823, prompted the construction of the bollards.

See also
 List of islands of Ireland

References

External links

 Sligo boat charters
 Sligoheritage.com - "Miracle of Coney"

Islands of County Sligo
Tidal islands of Ireland